The men's team at the 2022 South East Asian Table Tennis Championships in Bangkok, Thailand was held at Fashion Island Hall 3rd from 23 to 24 June 2022.

Schedule 
All times are Thailand Standard Time (UTC+07:00)

Group Stage

Group A

Group B

Main bracket

Semifinals

Gold-medal match

References 

South East Asian Table Tennis Championships